In firearms, a trapdoor is a form of breech-loading mechanism for rifles in which a hinged breechblock rotates up and forward, resembling the movement of a trapdoor. The Springfield models 1865 and 1873 were best known for first employing this type of action.

Specifications 

The trapdoor mechanism employed a hinged breechblock that rotated up and forward, resembling the movement of a trapdoor, to open the breech of the rifle and permit insertion of a cartridge. The hinged breechblock caused these rifles to be named "Trapdoor Springfields".

The conversion from musket to breechloader was done by milling open the barrel's breech section and inserting a hinged trapdoor  fastened to the top of the barrel. A thumb-operated cam latch at the rear of the breechblock held it shut when in closed position. The rack-type system extractor was withdrawn automatically as the breechblock was opened and snapped back at the end of its stroke. The firing pin was housed within the breechblock. The hammer nose was flattened to accommodate the firing pin.

Approximately 5,000 Civil War Model 1861 rifled muskets were converted at the Springfield Armory in 1866. It soon became apparent that many of the small working parts in the breech system were not going to have a long service life, and the action was too complicated for normal service use. Therefore, before the Model 1865 production order was completed, a less complex rifle was already being tested. This caused the Model 1865 to be called the "First Allin", and the following revised model, the Springfield Model 1866, to be called the "Second Allin".

The Springfield model 1865 fired a rimfire .58-60-500 cartridge (.58 inch  bullet,  of black powder), the caliber matching that of the Civil War Minié ball, which was originally used in these rifles.

The Model 1865 quickly became obsolete, and most of them were sold in the 1870s to several American arms dealers. At the time, there was a large demand in the US for shorter cadet-style rifles. To satisfy this need, these dealers cut the barrels and stocks to make short rifles with 33-inch and 36-inch barrel lengths. Likewise, the stock wrists were often thinned for cadet use.

Selection process 

In 1872–1873 a military board, headed by Brigadier-General Alfred H. Terry, conducted an examination and trial of 99 rifles from several domestic and foreign manufacturers, including those from Springfield, Sharps, Peabody, Whitney, Spencer, Remington, and Winchester pursuant to the selection of a breech-loading system for rifles and carbines for the U.S. Military.

The trials included tests for: accuracy, dependability, rate of fire, and ability to withstand adverse conditions. Both single-shot and magazine-equipped systems were considered, but, at the time, the single-shot was deemed to be more reliable. Firing tests were held at the Springfield Armory and Governor's Island where the average rate of fire for the Springfield was 8 rounds per minute for new recruits and 15 rounds per minute for experienced soldiers. The board recommended "No. 99 Springfield" which became the model 1873.

After considerable testing, the prototype developed by Erskine S. Allin of the government-operated Springfield Armory was chosen for its simplicity and the fact that it could be produced by the modification of existing Springfield Model 1863 muskets. These modifications cost about $5 per rifle, which was a significant savings at a time when new rifles cost about $20 each. Patent No. 49,959 was issued to Erskine S. Allin on September 19, 1865, describing the design.

In fiction 
The Springfield rifles with this modification. ¨The Gun That Made One Man The Equal Of Five¨, come out in the epilogue of the action in the film Springfield Rifle (used to stop the thieves stealing horses for the Confederates).

See also 
 Wänzl rifle, Austro-Hungarian service weapons
 M1867 Russian Krnka
 Infanteriegewehr Modell 1842, earlier trapdoor action gun

Bibliography
Historical Dictionary of the U.S. Army by Jerold E. Brown, published by Greenwood Publishing Group, 2001
The .58 and .50 Caliber Rifles and Carbines of the Springfield Armory by Richard A. Hosmer, published by North Cape Publications, May 2006

References

External links 

 Article on Trapdoor History and an animated gif showing the action movement.
 Model 1865 Rifles and Short Rifles at Trapdoor Collector

Firearm actions